Albert Dayer (born 11 October 1925) was a Belgian athlete. He competed in the men's decathlon at the 1948 Summer Olympics.

References

External links
 

1925 births
Possibly living people
Athletes (track and field) at the 1948 Summer Olympics
Belgian decathletes
Olympic athletes of Belgium
People from Ixelles
Sportspeople from Brussels